TalkWorks was a program designed to allow computers equipped with an appropriate fax-modem to act as a voice mail program. 

Original work was done on the program by AudioFile, a company that specialized in computer-based voice technology. This firm was bought by Delrina in 1994, which then rolled this technology into the initial TalkWorks program. The program was bundled as part of the CommSuite 95 suite of products, and featured a Telephony Application Programming Interface that could discriminate whether an incoming call was a fax, data communications, or a regular voice call. TalkWorks would start and digitally record a message when a regular voice call came through.

When Delrina was bought by Symantec in late 1995, the company acquired this product as well, and continued its development, and its optional add-on voice mail capabilities were first available with WinFax PRO version 7.0.  TalkWorks voice mail capabilities were included as a standard feature with the release of WinFax PRO 7.5 (October, 1996) and WinFax PRO 8.0 (March, 1997). Symantec decided that TalkWorks would be sold as a separate product with the release of WinFax PRO 9.0 in 1998. TalkWorks PRO 2.0 was released in August 1998, which was essentially WinFax PRO 9.0 with voice mail capabilities. 1 year later, TalkWorks PRO 3.0 was released and was the last version of TalkWorks PRO developed. Today, current versions of Symantec's WinFax PRO no longer support TalkWorks or include any voice mail capabilities.

External links
Press Release from October 18, 1994: "Delrina Acquires AudioFile", WaybackMachine archive, accessed November 6, 2005
Press Release from August 16, 1999: "TalkWorks PRO 3.0 Manages Voice/Fax Communications to Give Small Businesses a More Professional Image"
Review of Cyberjack browser, accessed November 6, 2005

Communication software